Hodkovičky is a cadastral district of Prague, Czech Republic. In 2011 it had 3708 inhabitants.

References 

Districts of Prague